Skate sailing is a method of moving over ice standing on ice skates utilizing the force of the wind.  A small sail is held in ones hands or leaned against with the whole body.  Using a metal blade under foot and the height of the ice skates is of much importance in being able to steer as much it is  acquiring the technique to gain an edge.

Skate sailing is a  windsport with a long tradition, probably as old as ice skates themselves. It is distinct from land-based Wind skating,  which is inspired by Windsurfing and commonly makes use of a skateboard or inline skates.

Skate sailing is using a sail and the wind to propel oneself across any relatively flat, hard surface. Skate sailing can be done in summer on roller blades, roller skis, cross skates, etc. Winter sailing can be enjoyed on downhill skis, snow blades, ice skates, or any other sliding footwear.

References

External links
Ontario Ministry Of Government Services,Archives
Skate Sailing with sail held to leeward
How to Skate Sail with sail carried on windward shoulder
Stand Inside Wing  Skate Sails
Skate Sailing Links
The first universal folding skate sail

Sailing
Sailing
Ice in transportation